Dicaea or Dikaia, also called Dikaiopolis was a Greek port town on the coast of ancient Thrace on Lake Bistonis, in the country of the Bistones. Stephanus of Byzantium wrote that it took its name from the Dicaeus who was son of Poseidon.

The place appears to have decayed at an early period. In the 19th century, William Hazlitt wrote that its site was that of the later Stabulum Diomedis ('Diomedes's stable'), where Theodoric Strabo died in 481 CE. However, modern scholarship rejects this identification and identifies Stabulum Diomedis with Tirida.

References

See also
Greek colonies in Thrace

Populated places in ancient Thrace
Former populated places in Greece
Greek colonies in Thrace